Rafael Leónidas Trujillo Molina (24 October 1891 – 30 May 1961), nicknamed El Jefe ("The Chief" or "The Boss"), was a Dominican dictator who ruled Dominican Republic from August 1930 until his assassination in May 1961. He served as president from 1930 to 1938 and again from 1942 to 1952, ruling for the rest of the time as an unelected military strongman under figurehead presidents. His rule of 31 years, known to Dominicans as the Trujillo Era ( or La Era de Trujillo), is considered one of the bloodiest and most corrupt regimes in the Western hemisphere, and centered around a personality cult of the ruling family. Trujillo's security forces, including the infamous SIM, were responsible for perhaps as many as 50,000 murders, including between 12,000 and 30,000 Haitians in the infamous Parsley massacre in 1937, which continues to affect Dominican-Haitian relations to this day. 

During his long rule, the Trujillo government's extensive use of state terrorism was prolific even beyond national borders, including the attempted assassination of Venezuelan President Rómulo Betancourt in 1960, the abduction and disappearance in New York City of the Basque-Dominican exile Jesús Galíndez in 1956, and the murder of Spanish writer José Almoina in Mexico, also in 1960. These acts, particularly the presumed murder of Galindez, a naturalized US citizen, the attempted murder Betancourt, a staunch critic of Trujillo, and the murder of the Mirabal sisters, who were among his most notable opponents, in 1960, eroded relations between the Dominican Republic and the international community and ushered in OAS sanctions and economic and military assistance to Dominican opposition forces. After this momentous year, large segments of the Dominican establishment including the military, turned against him.

On 30 May 1961, he was assassinated by a group of conspirators led by the Dominican general Antonio Imbert Barrera. In the immediate aftermath, Trujillo's son Ramfis took temporary control of the country, exterminating most of the conspirators. By November 1961, the Trujillo family was pressured into exile by the titular president Balaguer, who introduced reforms to open up the regime. The murder ushered in civil strife which concluded with the Dominican Civil War and a US intervention, eventually stabilised under a multi-party system in 1966. 

The Trujillo era unfolded in a Hispanic Caribbean environment particularly susceptible to dictators. In the countries of the Caribbean Basin alone, his dictatorship overlapped with those in Cuba, Nicaragua, Guatemala, El Salvador, Honduras, Venezuela and Haiti. In perspective, the Trujillo dictatorship has been judged more prominent and more brutal than its contemporaries. Trujillo remains a polarizing figure in the Dominican Republic, as the longevity and profound importance of his rule makes a detached evaluation difficult. While his supporters credit him for bringing long-term stability, economic growth and prosperity, doubling life expectancy of average Dominicans and multiplying the GDP, critics denounce the heavy-handed and violent rule of his 30 years in power, including the murder of tens of thousands, his open racism and xenophobia towards Haitians, as well as the Trujillo family's nepotism, widespread corruption and looting of the country's natural resources.

Early life
Rafael Leónidas Trujillo y Molina was born on 26 October 1891 in San Cristóbal, Dominican Republic, into a lower-middle-class family. His father was José Trujillo Valdez, the son of Silveria Valdez Méndez of colonial Dominican origin and José Trujillo Monagas, a Spanish sergeant who arrived in Santo Domingo as a member of the Spanish reinforcement troops during the annexation era. Trujillo's mother was Altagracia Julia Molina Chevalier, later known as Mama Julia, the daughter of Pedro Molina Peña, also of colonial Dominican origin, and the teacher Luisa Erciná Chevalier, whose parents were part of the remaining French descendants in Haiti: Trujillo's maternal great-grandfather, Justin Víctor Turenne Carrié Blaise, was of French descent, while his maternal great-grandmother, Eleonore Juliette Chevallier Moreau, was part of Haiti's mulatto class. Trujillo was the third of eleven children; he also had an adopted brother, Luis Rafael "Nene" Trujillo (1935–2005), who was raised in the home of Trujillo Molina.

In 1897, at the age of six, Trujillo was registered in the school of Juan Hilario Meriño. One year later, he transferred to the school of Broughton, where he became a pupil of Eugenio María de Hostos and remained there for the rest of his primary schooling. As a child, he was obsessed with his appearance and would place bottle caps on his clothes that mimicked military decorations. At the age of 16, Trujillo got a job as a telegraph operator, which he held for about three years. Shortly after Trujillo turned to crime: cattle stealing, check counterfeiting, and postal robbery. He spent several months in prison, which did not deter him, as he later formed a violent gang of robbers called The 42.

Rise to power

In 1916, the United States began its occupation of the Dominican Republic following 28 revolutions in 50 years. At the time, Trujillo was twenty-five and worked as a guardacampestre (ranger), controlling sugar cane workers at a plantation in Boca Chica. The occupying force soon established a Dominican army constabulary to impose order. Trujillo joined the National Guard in 1918 with the help of his employer along with US Major James J. MacLean, who was his maternal uncle Teódulo Pina Chevalier's friend, immediately receiving the rank of second lieutenant and training with the US Marines. Allegations of forgery were ignored when Trujillo applied and he was later acquitted by a panel of Marines following plausible accusations of rape and extortion. Colonel Richard Malcolm Cutts trained Trujillo further and many Marine leaders praised his abilities at the time, approving his rise among the ranks.

President Horacio Vásquez named Trujillo the commander of the Dominican National Police in 1925, he was named brigadier general in 1927 and in 1928, Trujillo reconstituted the police into the army and created it as an independent armed body under his control. A rebellion or coup d'état against President Vásquez broke out in February 1930 in Santiago. Trujillo secretly cut a deal with the rebel leader Rafael Estrella Ureña. In return for Trujillo letting Estrella take power, Estrella would allow Trujillo to run for president in new elections. As the rebels marched toward Santo Domingo, Vásquez ordered Trujillo to suppress them. However, feigning "neutrality", Trujillo kept his men in barracks, allowing Estrella's rebels to take the capital virtually unopposed. On 3 March, Estrella was proclaimed acting president, with Trujillo confirmed as head of the police and of the army. As per their agreement, Trujillo became the presidential nominee of the Patriotic Coalition of Citizens (Spanish: Coalición patriotica de los ciudadanos), with Estrella as his running mate. The other candidates became targets of harassment by the army. When it became apparent that the army would allow only Trujillo to campaign unhindered, the other candidates pulled out. Ultimately, the Trujillo-Estrella ticket was proclaimed victorious with an implausible 99% of the vote. In a note to the State Department, American ambassador Charles Boyd Curtis wrote that Trujillo received far more votes than actual voters.

In government

Two and a half weeks after Trujillo ascended to the presidency, the destructive Hurricane San Zenon hit Santo Domingo and left 2000 dead. As a response to the disaster, Trujillo placed the Dominican Republic under martial law and began to rebuild the city. He renamed the rebuilt capital of the Dominican Republic Ciudad Trujillo ("Trujillo City") in his honor and had streets, monuments, and landmarks to honor him throughout the country.

On 16 August 1931, the first anniversary of his inauguration, Trujillo made the Dominican Party the nation's sole legal political party. However, the country had effectively become a one-party state with Trujillo's inauguration. Government employees were required by law to "donate" 10% of their salaries to the national treasury and there was strong pressure on adult citizens to join the party. Members had to carry a membership card, nick-named the "Palmita" since the cover had a palm tree on it, and a person could be arrested for vagrancy without one. Those who did not join or contribute to the party did so at their own risk. Opponents of the régime were mysteriously killed.

In 1934, Trujillo, who had promoted himself to generalissimo of the army, was up for re-election. By then, there was no organized opposition left in the country, and he was elected as the sole candidate on the ballot. In addition to the widely rigged (and regularly uncontested) elections, he instated "civic reviews" with large crowds shouting their loyalty to the government, which would in turn create more support for Trujillo.

Personality cult

In 1936, at the suggestion of Mario Fermín Cabral, the Congress of the Dominican Republic voted overwhelmingly to change the name of the capital from Santo Domingo to Ciudad Trujillo. The province of San Cristóbal was renamed to "Trujillo" and the nation's highest peak, Pico Duarte to Pico Trujillo. Statues of "El Jefe" were mass-produced and erected across the Dominican Republic, and bridges and public buildings were named in his honor. The nation's newspapers had praise for Trujillo as part of the front page, and license plates included slogans such as "¡Viva Trujillo!" and "Año Del Benefactor De La Patria" (Year of the Benefactor of the Nation). An electric sign was erected in Ciudad Trujillo so that "Dios y Trujillo" could be seen at night as well as in the day. Eventually, even churches were required to post the slogan "Dios en cielo, Trujillo en tierra" (God in Heaven, Trujillo on Earth). As time went on, the order of the phrases was reversed (Trujillo on Earth, God in Heaven). Trujillo was recommended for the Nobel Peace Prize by his admirers, but the committee declined the suggestion.

Trujillo was eligible to run again in 1938, but, citing the United States example of two presidential terms, he stated, "I voluntarily, and against the wishes of my people, refuse re-election to the high office." In fact, a vigorous re-election campaign had been launched in the middle of 1937 but the international uproar that followed the Haitian massacre later that year forced Trujillo to announce his "return to private life." Consequently, the Dominican Party nominated Trujillo's handpicked successor, 61-year-old vice-president Jacinto Peynado, with Manuel de Jesús Troncoso his running mate. They appeared alone on the ballot in the 1938 election. Trujillo kept his positions as generalissimo of the army and leader of the Dominican Party. It was understood that Peynado was merely a puppet, and Trujillo still held all governing power in the nation. Peynado increased the size of the electric "Dios y Trujillo" sign and died on 7 March 1940, with Troncoso serving out the rest of the term. However, in 1942, with US President Franklin Roosevelt having run for a third term in the United States, Trujillo ran for president again and was elected unopposed. He served for two terms, which he lengthened to five years each. In 1952, under pressure from the Organization of American States, he ceded the presidency to his brother, Héctor. Despite being officially out of power, Rafael Trujillo organized a major national celebration to commemorate 25 years of his rule in 1955. Gold and silver commemorative coins were minted with his image.

Oppression
Brutal oppression of actual or perceived members of the opposition was the key feature of Trujillo's rule from the very beginning in 1930 when his gang, "The 42", led by Miguel Angel Paulino, drove through the streets in their red Packard "carro de la muerte" ("car of death"). Trujillo also maintained an execution list of people throughout the world who he felt were his direct enemies or who he felt had wronged him. He even once allowed an opposition party to form and permitted it to operate legally and openly, mainly so that he could identify those who opposed him and arrest or kill them.

Imprisonments and killings were later handled by the SIM, the Servicio de Inteligencia Militar, efficiently organized by Johnny Abbes, who operated in Cuba, Mexico, Guatemala, New York, Costa Rica, and Venezuela. Some cases reached international notoriety such as the disappearance of Jesús de Galíndez and the murder of the Mirabal sisters, which further eroded Trujillo's critical support by the US government. After Trujillo approved an assassination attempt on the Venezuelan President Rómulo Ernesto Betancourt Bello, the Organization of American States and the United States blocked Trujillo's access to US sugar quota profits.

Immigration
Trujillo was known for his open-door policy, accepting Jewish refugees from Europe, Japanese migration during the 1930s, and exiles from Spain following its civil war. At the 1938 Évian Conference the Dominican Republic was the only country willing to accept many Jews and offered to accept up to 100,000 refugees on generous terms. In 1940 an agreement was signed and Trujillo donated  of his properties for settlements. The first settlers arrived in May 1940; eventually, some 800 settlers came to Sosúa and most moved later on to the United States.

Refugees from Europe broadened the Dominican Republic's tax base and added more whites to the predominantly mixed-race nation. Trujillo’s government favored white refugees over others while Dominican troops expelled illegal immigrants, resulting in the 1937 Parsley Massacre of Haitian migrants.

Environmental policy

The Trujillo regime greatly expanded the Vedado del Yaque, a nature reserve around the Yaque del Sur River. In 1934 he banned the slash-and-burn method of clearing land for agriculture, set up a forest warden agency to protect the park system, and banned the logging of pine trees without his permission. In the 1950s the Trujillo regime commissioned a study on the hydroelectric potential of damming the Dominican Republic's waterways. The commission concluded that only forested waterways could support hydroelectric dams, so Trujillo banned logging in potential river watersheds. After his assassination in 1961, logging resumed in the Dominican Republic. Squatters burned down the forests for agriculture, and logging companies clear-cut parks. In 1967, President Joaquín Balaguer launched military strikes against illegal logging.

Trujillo encouraged foreign investment in the Dominican Republic, particularly from Americans. He gave a concession with mineral rights in the Azua Basin to Clem S. Clarke, an oilman from Shreveport, Louisiana.

Foreign policy

Trujillo tended toward peaceful coexistence with the United States government. During World War II, Trujillo symbolically sided with the Allies and declared war on Germany, Italy and Japan on 11 December 1941. While there was no military participation, the Dominican Republic thus became a founding member of the United Nations. Trujillo encouraged diplomatic and economic ties with the United States, but his policies often caused friction with other nations of Latin America, especially Costa Rica and Venezuela. He maintained friendly relations with Franco of Spain, Perón of Argentina, and Somoza of Nicaragua. Towards the end of his rule, his relationship with the United States deteriorated.

Hull–Trujillo Treaty
Early on, Trujillo determined that Dominican financial affairs had to be put in order, and that included ending the United States's role as collector of Dominican customs—a situation that had existed since 1907 and was confirmed in a 1924 convention signed at the end of the occupation.

Negotiations started in 1936 and lasted four years. On 24 September 1940, Trujillo and the American Secretary of State Cordell Hull signed the Hull–Trujillo Treaty, whereby the United States relinquished control over the collection and application of customs revenues, and the Dominican Republic committed to deposit consolidated government revenues in a special bank account to guarantee repayment of foreign debt. The government was free to set custom duties with no restrictions.

This diplomatic success gave Trujillo the occasion to launch a massive propaganda campaign that presented him as the savior of the nation. A law proclaimed that the Benefactor was also now the Restaurador de la independencia financiera de la Republica (Restorer of the Republic's financial independence).

Haiti

Haiti had historically occupied what is now the Dominican Republic from 1822 to 1844. Encroachment by Haiti was an ongoing process, and when Trujillo took over, specifically the northwestern border region had become increasingly "Haitianized". The border was poorly defined. In 1933, and again in 1935, Trujillo met the Haitian President Sténio Vincent to settle the border issue. By 1936, they reached and signed a settlement. At the same time, Trujillo plotted against the Haitian government by linking up with General Calixte, Commander of the Garde d'Haiti, and Élie Lescot, at that time the Haitian ambassador in Ciudad Trujillo (Santo Domingo). After the settlement, when further border incursions occurred, Trujillo initiated the Parsley Massacre.

Parsley massacre

Known as La Masacre del Perejil in Spanish, the massacre was started by Trujillo in 1937. Claiming that Haiti was harboring his former Dominican opponents, he ordered an attack on the border that slaughtered tens of thousands of Haitians as they tried to escape. The number of dead is still unknown, but it is now calculated between 12,000 and 30,000. The Dominican military used machetes to murder and decapitate many of the victims; they also took people to the port of Montecristi, where many victims were thrown into the sea to drown with their hands and feet bound.

The Haitian response was muted, but its government eventually called for an international investigation. Under pressure from Washington, Trujillo agreed to a reparation settlement in January 1938 of US$750,000. By the next year, the amount had been reduced to US$525,000 (US$ million in ); 30 dollars per victim, of which only two cents were given to survivors because of corruption in the Haitian bureaucracy.

In 1941, Lescot, who had received financial support from Trujillo, succeeded Vincent as President of Haiti. Trujillo expected that Lescot would be his puppet, but Lescot turned against him. Trujillo unsuccessfully tried to assassinate him in a 1944 plot and then published their correspondence to discredit him. Lescot fled into exile in 1946 after demonstrations against him.

Cuba
In 1947, Dominican exiles, including Juan Bosch, had concentrated in Cuba. With the approval and support of Cuba's government, led by Ramón Grau, an expeditionary force was trained with the intention of invading the Dominican Republic and overthrowing Trujillo. However, international pressure, including from the United States, made the exiles abort the expedition. In turn, when Fulgencio Batista was in power, Trujillo initially supported anti-Batista supporters of Carlos Prío Socarrás in Oriente Province in 1955; however, weapons Trujillo sent were soon inherited by Fidel Castro's insurgents when Prío allied with Castro; Dominican-made Cristóbal carbines and hand grenades became the rebels' standard weapons.

After 1956, when Trujillo saw that Castro was gaining ground, he started to support Batista with money, planes, equipment, and men. Trujillo, convinced that Batista would prevail, was very surprised when Batista showed up as a fugitive after he had been ousted. Trujillo kept Batista until August 1959 as a "virtual prisoner". Only after paying US$3–4 million Batista could leave for Portugal, which had granted him a visa.

Castro made threats to overthrow Trujillo, and Trujillo responded by increasing the budget for national defense. A foreign legion was formed to defend Haiti, as it was expected that Castro might invade the Haitian part of the island first and remove François Duvalier as well. A Cuban plane with 56 fighting men landed near Constanza, Dominican Republic, on Sunday, 14 June 1959, and six days later more invaders brought by two yachts landed at the north coast. However, the Dominican Army prevailed.

In turn, in August 1959, Johnny Abbes attempted to support an anti-Castro group led by Escambray near Trinidad, Cuba. The attempt, however, was thwarted when Cuban troops surprised a plane he had sent when it was unloading its cargo.

Betancourt assassination attempt

By the late 1950s, opposition to Trujillo's regime was starting to build to a fever pitch, especially among a younger generation who had no memory of the poverty and instability that had preceded the dictatorship. Many clamored for democratization. The Trujillo regime responded with greater repression. The Military Intelligence Service (SIM) secret police, led by Johnny Abbes, remained as ubiquitous as before. Other nations ostracized the Dominican Republic, compounding the dictator's paranoia.

Trujillo began to interfere more and more in the domestic affairs of neighboring countries. He expressed great contempt for Venezuela's president Rómulo Betancourt; an established and outspoken opponent of Trujillo, Betancourt associated with Dominicans who had plotted against the dictator. Trujillo developed an obsessive personal hatred of Betancourt and supported numerous plots by Venezuelan exiles to overthrow him. This pattern of intervention led the Venezuelan government to take its case against Trujillo to the Organization of American States (OAS), a move that infuriated Trujillo, who ordered his agents to plant a bomb in Betancourt's car. The assassination attempt, carried out on Friday, 24 June 1960, injured but did not kill the Venezuelan president.

The Betancourt incident inflamed world opinion against Trujillo. Outraged OAS members voted unanimously to sever diplomatic relations with his government and impose economic sanctions on the Dominican Republic. The brutal murder on Friday, 25 November 1960, of the three Mirabal sisters, Patria, María Teresa and Minerva, who opposed Trujillo's dictatorship, further increased discontent with his repressive rule. The dictator had become an embarrassment to the United States, and relations became especially strained after the Betancourt incident.

Personal life
Trujillo's "central arch" was his instinct for power. This was coupled with an intense desire for money, which he recognized as a source of and support for power. Up at four in the morning, he exercised, studied the newspaper, read many reports, and completed papers before breakfast. At the office by nine, he continued his work, and took lunch by noon. After a walk, he continued to work until 7:30 pm. After dinner, he attended functions, held discussions, or was driven around incognito in the city "observing and remembering." Until Santo Domingo's National Palace was built in 1947, he worked out of the Casas Reales, the colonial-era Viceregal center of administration. Today the building is a museum; on display are his desk and chair, along with a massive collection of arms and armor that he bought. He was methodical, punctual, secretive, and guarded; he had no true friends, only associates and acquaintances. For his associates, his actions towards them were unpredictable.

Trujillo and his family amassed enormous wealth. He acquired cattle lands on a grand scale, and went into meat and milk production, operations that soon evolved into monopolies. Salt, sugar, tobacco, lumber, and the lottery were other industries which he or his family members dominated. Family members also received positions within the government and the army, including one of Trujillo's sons who was made a colonel in the Dominican Army when he was only four years old. Two of Trujillo's brothers, Héctor and José Arismendy, also held positions in his government. José Arismendy Trujillo oversaw the creation of the main radio station, La Voz Dominicana, and later the television station, the fourth in the Caribbean.

By 1937 Trujillo's annual income was about $1.5 million ($ million in ); at the time of his death the state took over 111 Trujillo-owned companies. His love of fine and ostentatious clothing was displayed in elaborate uniforms and suits, of which he collected almost two thousand. Fond of neckties, he amassed a collection of over ten thousand. Trujillo doused himself with perfume and liked gossip.
His sexual appetite was rapacious, and he preferred mulatta women with full bodies.

Trujillo was married three times and kept other women as mistresses. On 13 August 1913, Trujillo married Aminta Ledesma Lachapelle, with whom he had 2 daughters, Julia, who died as an infant, and Flor de Oro, who died of lung cancer in 1978. On 30 March 1927, Trujillo married Bienvenida Ricardo Martínez, a girl from Monte Cristi and the daughter of Buenaventura Ricardo Heureaux. A year later he met María de los Angeles Martínez Alba (nicknamed "la españolita", or "the little Spanish girl"), and had an affair with her. He divorced Bienvenida in 1935 and married Martínez. A year later he had a daughter with Bienvenida, named Odette Trujillo Ricardo.

Trujillo's three children with María Martínez were Rafael Leónidas Ramfis, who was born on 5 June 1929, María de los Ángeles del Sagrado Corazón de Jesús (Angelita), born in Paris on 10 June 1939, and Leónidas Rhadamés, born on 1 December 1942. Ramfis and Rhadamés were named after characters in Giuseppe Verdi's opera Aida.

In 1937, Trujillo met Lina Lovatón Pittaluga, an upper-class debutante with whom he had two children, Yolanda in 1939, and Rafael, born on 20 June 1943.

In spite of Trujillo's indifference to the game of baseball, the dictator invited many black American players to the Dominican Republic, where they received good pay for playing on first-class, un-segregated teams. The great Negro league star Satchel Paige pitched for Los Dragones of Ciudad Trujillo, a team organized by Trujillo. Paige later claimed, jokingly, that his guards positioned themselves "like a firing squad" to encourage him to pitch well. Los Dragones won the 1937 Dominican championship at Estadio Trujillo in Ciudad Trujillo.

Trujillo was energetic and fit. He was generally quite healthy but suffered from chronic lower urinary infections and, later, prostate problems. In 1934, Dr. Georges Marion was called from Paris to perform three urologic procedures on Trujillo.

Over time Trujillo acquired numerous homes. His favorite was Casa Caobas, on Estancia Fundacion near San Cristóbal. He also used Estancia Ramfis (which, after 1953, became the Foreign Office), Estancia Rhadames, and a home at Playa de Najayo. Less frequently he stayed at places he owned in Santiago de los Caballeros, Constanza, La Cumbre, San José de las Matas, and elsewhere. He maintained a penthouse at the Embajador Hotel in the capital.

While Trujillo was nominally a Roman Catholic, his devotion was limited to a perfunctory role in public affairs; he placed faith in local folk religion.

He was popularly known as "El Jefe" ("The Chief") or "El Benefactor" ("The Benefactor") but was privately referred to as Chapitas ("Bottlecaps") because of his indiscriminate wearing of medals. Dominican children emulated Trujillo by constructing toy medals from bottle caps. He was also known as "El Chivo" ("The Goat").

Assassination

On Tuesday, 30 May 1961, Trujillo was shot and killed when his blue 1957 Chevrolet Bel Air was ambushed on a road outside the Dominican capital. He was the victim of an ambush plotted by a number of men, such as General Juan Tomás Díaz, Pedro Livio Cedeño, Antonio de la Maza, Amado García Guerrero and General Antonio Imbert Barrera. The plotters, however, failed to take control as the later-executed General José René Román Fernandez ("Pupo Román") betrayed his co-conspirators by his inactivity, and contingency plans had not been made. On the other side, Johnny Abbes, Roberto Figueroa Carrión, and the Trujillo family put the SIM to work to hunt the members of the plot and brought back Ramfis Trujillo from Paris to step into his father's shoes. The response by the SIM was swift and brutal. Hundreds of suspects were detained, many tortured. On 18 November the last executions took place when six of the conspirators were executed in the "Hacienda María Massacre". Imbert was the only one of the seven assassins who survived the manhunt. A co-conspirator named Luis Amiama Tio also survived.

US President John F. Kennedy learned of Trujillo's death during a diplomatic meeting with French President Charles de Gaulle.

Trujillo's funeral was that of a statesman with the long procession ending in his hometown of San Cristóbal, where his body was first buried. Dominican President Joaquín Balaguer gave the eulogy. The efforts of the Trujillo family to keep control of the country ultimately failed. The military uprising on 19 November of the Rebellion of the Pilots and the threat of US intervention set the final stage and ended the Trujillo regime. Ramfis tried to flee with his father's body aboard his boat Angelita, but was turned back. Balaguer allowed Ramfis to leave the country and to take his father's body to Paris. There, the remains were interred in the Cimetière du Père Lachaise on 14 August 1964, and six years later moved to Spain, to the Mingorrubio Cemetery in El Pardo on the north side of Madrid.

The role of the CIA in the killing has been debated. Imbert insisted that the plotters acted on their own. However, Trujillo was certainly murdered with weapons supplied by the CIA.

In a 1975 report to the Deputy Attorney General of the United States, CIA officials described the agency as having "no active part" in the assassination and only a "faint connection" with the groups that planned the killing. 

US involvement appears to go deeper than supplying weapons. In the 1950s, the CIA gave José Figueres Ferrer money to publish a political journal, Combate and to found a left-wing school for Latin American opposition leaders. Funds passed from a shell foundation to the Jacob Merrill Kaplan Fund; then to the Institute of International Labor Research (IILR) headed by Norman Thomas, six-time US presidential candidate for the Socialist Party of America; and finally to Figueres, Sacha Volman, and Juan Bosch. Sacha Volman, treasurer of the IILR, was a CIA agent.

Cord Meyer was a CIA official responsible for manipulating international groups. He used the contacts with Bosch, Volman, and Figueres for a new purpose, as the United States moved to rally the Western Hemisphere against Cuba's Fidel Castro, Trujillo had become expendable. Dissidents inside the Dominican Republic argued that assassination was the only certain way to remove Trujillo.

According to Chester Bowles, the Undersecretary of State, internal Department of State discussions in 1961 on the topic were vigorous. Richard N. Goodwin, Assistant Special Counsel to the President, who had direct contacts with the rebel alliance, argued for intervention against Trujillo. Quoting Bowles directly: The next morning I learned that in spite of the clear decision against having the dissident group request our assistance Dick Goodwin following the meeting sent a cable to CIA people in the Dominican Republic without checking with State or CIA; indeed, with the protest of the Department of State. The cable directed the CIA people in the Dominican Republic to get this request at any cost. When Allen Dulles found this out the next morning, he withdrew the order. We later discovered it had already been carried out.

An internal CIA memorandum states that a 1973 Office of Inspector General investigation into the murder disclosed "quite extensive Agency involvement with the plotters." The CIA described its role in "changing" the government of the Dominican Republic "as a 'success' in that it assisted in moving the Dominican Republic from a totalitarian dictatorship to a Western-style democracy."

Juan Bosch, the earlier recipient of CIA funding, was elected president of the Dominican Republic in 1962 and was deposed in 1963.

Even after the death of Trujillo, the unusual events continued. In November 1961, Mexican police found a corpse they identified as Luis Melchior Vidal, Jr., godson of Trujillo. Vidal was the unofficial business agent of the Dominican Republic while Trujillo was in power. Under the cover of the American Sucrose Company and the Paint Company of America, Vidal had teamed up with the US-American Joel David Kaplan to operate as arms merchants for the CIA.

Joel David Kaplan was the nephew of the previously mentioned Jacob Merrill Kaplan. The older Kaplan earned his fortune primarily through operations in Cuba and the Dominican Republic.

In 1962, the younger Kaplan was convicted of killing Vidal, in Mexico City. He was sentenced to 28 years in prison. Kaplan escaped from a Mexican prison using a helicopter. The dramatic event was the basis for the Charles Bronson action film Breakout.

The Mexican police requested for the FBI to arrest and remand Joel Kaplan on 20 August 1971. Kaplan's attorney claimed that Kaplan was a CIA agent. Neither the FBI nor the US Department of Justice has pursued the issue. The Mexican government never initiated extradition proceedings against Kaplan.

Honors and awards
 Legion d'honneur
 Order of the Holy Sepulchre of Jerusalem

In media

{| class="wikitable sortable" style="width:100%;"
|-
!width=5%|Media type!!width=25%|Title!!Release date!!class=unsortable|Details
|-
|Book
|Trujillo: The Little Caesar of the Caribbean
|1958
|Authored by Germán Ornes Coiscou, this book reveals the terror of Trujillo's dictatorship as it became a cancerous growth infecting generations of Dominicans for more than 30 years.
|-
|Book
|The Terrible Ones
|1966
|Authored by Valerie Moolman, the book describes the attempts of The Terrible Ones (the widows of murdered Trujillo opponents), Cuban fidelistas and Chinese communist forces to locate and recover US$100 million in gold and precious stones accumulated by Trujillo during his dictatorship.
|-
|Book
|The Day of the Jackal
|1971
|Authored by Frederick Forsyth, the book fictitiously attributes "credit" for this assassination to the titular assassin. An English arms dealer, suspected of being "the Jackal", had a meeting with Trujillo's chief of police in Ciudad Trujillo on 30 May 1961, trying to sell the police British surplus submachine guns. However, Trujillo is assassinated that same day, and the arms dealer is forced to flee the Dominican Republic.
|-
|Film
|The Day of the Jackal
|1973
|Directed by Fred Zinnemann, the film, like the book of the same title, fictitiously attributes "credit" for this assassination to its titular assassin.
|-
|Book
|Memorias de un Cortesano de la Era de Trujillo
|1988
|Authored by Joaquín Balaguer, the last puppet president of the Dominican Republic appointed by Trujillo, in 1960, and who went on to rule in his own right for most of the period 1966–1996.
|-
|Book
|La era de Trujillo: un estudio casuístico de dictadura hispanoamericana
|1990
| Manuel Vazquez Montalbán, a Catalan writer, wrote about Galíndez en 1990. The book is a fictional recreation of the life and disappearance of the diplomat.
|-
|Book
|In the Time of the Butterflies
|1994
|Authored by Julia Alvarez, the book describes the lives of the four Mirabal Sisters, who lived under Trujillo's regime; three of them eventually were killed after joining the resistance against his rule.
|-
|Documentary
|El Poder del Jefe I
|1994
|Directed by René Fortunato
|-
|Documentary
|Ken Burns' Baseball
|1994
|Winning the Dominican National Championship with Satchel Paige and Josh Gibson discussed in Inning Five: Shadow Ball.
|-
|TV Film
|Soul of the Game|1996
|Brief appearance during a baseball game in Santo Domingo.
|-
|Documentary
|El Poder del Jefe II|1996
|Directed by René Fortunato
|-
|Documentary
|El Poder del Jefe III|1998
|Directed by René Fortunato
|-
|Book
|The Feast of the Goat|2000
|A book by Mario Vargas Llosa, set in the Dominican Republic and portraying the assassination of the Dominican dictator, and its aftermath, from two distinct standpoints a generation apart: during and immediately after the assassination itself, in May 1961; and thirty-five years later, in 1996.
|-
|TV Film
|In the Time of the Butterflies|2001
|Directed by Mariano Barroso and Trujillo played by Edward James Olmos. Based on the novel by Julia Alvarez (1994) about the regime assassination of the dissident Mirabal sisters.
|-
|Book
|Before We Were Free|2002
|Julia Alvarez, a Dominican-American writer, wrote this young-adult novel about Anita, a twelve-year-old girl in the Dominican Republic in 1960, who realizes that life under the reign of Trujillo is much darker and more dangerous than she had previously known.
|-
|Film
|El Misterio Galíndez - The Galindez File|2003
|Gerardo Herrero directed El Misterio Galíndez, a movie about Jesús de Galíndez Suárez, activist of the PNV party and Basque diplomat who disappeared in 1956; allegedly because of his opposition to Trujillo's regime.
|-
|Film
|The Feast of the Goat (*)
|2006
|Directed by Luis Llosa and Trujillo played by Tomás Milián
|-
|Book
|The Brief Wondrous Life of Oscar Wao|2007
|Junot Díaz, a Santo Domingo-born American, wrote this Pulitzer Prize–winning book about a Dominican-American family. The book is a fictional account of the family's misfortunes interwoven with a recounting of the atrocities of Trujillo's regime, some of which are indirectly linked to the family's fate, following them like a curse or fukú across the generations.
|-
| Film
|Code Name: Butterflies|2009
|Directed by Cecilia Domeyko. Film about the life and death of the Mirabal sisters with interviews with people involved, and recreations of key events.
|-
| Film
|Trópico de Sangre|2010
|Directed by Juan Delancer and Trujillo played by Juan Fernández de Alarcon. The film focuses on Minerva Mirabal and tells the true story of how she and her sisters dared to stand up against dictator Rafael Trujillo and were assassinated in 1960 as a result. The film further details how this crime led to the assassination of Trujillo.
|}

 See also 
 
 
 

 Explanatory notes 

References
 Citations 

 General bibliography 

 
 
 
 
 
 
 
 

Further reading
 
 Cadeau, Sabine F. 2022. More than a Massacre: Racial Violence and Citizenship in the Haitian–Dominican Borderlands. Cambridge University Press.
 Hougan, Jim. Spooks: The Haunting of America & the Private Use of Secret Agents (non-fiction). New York: William Morrow (1978). .
 López-Calvo, Ignacio, "God and Trujillo": Literary and Cultural Representations of the Dominican Dictator. University Press of Florida (2005). .
 "GENERALISIMO E.N., RAFAEL LEONIDAS TRUJILLO MOLINA." Secretario de Estado de las Fuerzas Armadas. 
 Timoneda, Joan C.  "Institutions as Signals: How Dictators Consolidate Power in Times of Crisis." Comparative Politics, vol. 53, no. 1 (2020), pp. 49–68.
 Turits, Richard Lee. Foundations of Despotism: Peasants, the Trujillo Regime, and Modernity in Dominican History''. Stanford University Press (2004). .

External links

 
 Biography 
 

 
1891 births
1961 deaths
1961 murders in North America
Anti-Masonry
Assassinated Dominican Republic politicians
Assassinated heads of state
Assassinated people
Burials at Père Lachaise Cemetery
Burials at Mingorrubio Cemetery
Deaths by firearm in the Dominican Republic
Dominican Party politicians
Dominican Republic anti-communists
Dominican Republic military personnel
Dominican Republic people of Canarian descent
Dominican Republic people of French descent
Dominican Republic people of Haitian descent
Dominican Republic people of Spanish descent
Dominican Republic Roman Catholics
Generalissimos
Genocide perpetrators
Grand Crosses Special Class of the Order of Merit of the Federal Republic of Germany
People from San Cristóbal, Dominican Republic
People killed in Central Intelligence Agency operations
People of the Cold War
Politicide perpetrators
Presidents of the Dominican Republic
Recipients of the Legion of Honour
World War II political leaders
Far-right politics in South America